Muscoy is a census-designated place (CDP) in San Bernardino County, California, United States. The population was 10,644 at the 2010 census, up from 8,919 at the 2000 census. Muscoy shares ZIP code 92407 with the communities of Verdemont, Devore Heights, Rosena Ranch and Arrowhead Farms in northwestern San Bernardino. Residents enjoy a semi-rural setting with large lots where they can raise horses and other livestock, nursery plants, and fruit trees.  For this reason, much of Muscoy is included in the county Additional Agriculture (AA) overlay, which specifies the types and quantities of animals that may be kept on each parcel. A distinctive feature of Muscoy life today is motor vehicles and equestrians sharing the roadways.

History
Muscoy was developed in the mid-1890s as a community designed to accommodate family agricultural
enterprises. Roads and water service were developed to serve one to ten acre parcels. Vineyards, orchards and various field crops were planted and cultivated. After World War II, population growth accelerated and the area began a transition from agricultural use to a more suburban residential character. During the 1950s and 1960s, the San Bernardino area became a popular stop during road trips. This resulted in more shops opening up to serve the needs of travelers, and more people establishing permanent residences around the Muscoy area. In 1989, a gasoline pipeline explosion caused two deaths.

Geography
Muscoy is located at  (34.156009, -117.346552). Elevation ranges from 1240' in the south to 1600' in the north.

Muscoy is bordered on the west by Lytle Creek wash, most of the time a dry river bed, other times the scene of raging flash floods.

Demographics

2010
At the 2010 census Muscoy had a population of 10,644. The racial makeup of Muscoy was 4,459 (41.9%) White (11.0% Non-Hispanic White), 454 (4.3%) African American, 125 (1.2%) Native American, 101 (0.9%) Asian, 16 (0.2%) Pacific Islander, 4,992 (46.9%) from other races, and 497 (4.7%) from two or more races. Hispanic or Latino of any race were 8,824 persons (82.9%).

The census reported that 10,355 people (97.3% of the population) lived in households, 289 (2.7%) lived in non-institutionalized group quarters, and no one was institutionalized.

There were 2,231 households, 1,445 (64.8%) had children under the age of 18 living in them, 1,231 (55.2%) were opposite-sex married couples living together, 423 (19.0%) had a female householder with no husband present, 279 (12.5%) had a male householder with no wife present.  There were 236 (10.6%) unmarried opposite-sex partnerships, and 16 (0.7%) same-sex married couples or partnerships. 197 households (8.8%) were one person and 68 (3.0%) had someone living alone who was 65 or older. The average household size was 4.64.  There were 1,933 families (86.6% of households); the average family size was 4.76.

The age distribution was 3,780 people (35.5%) under the age of 18, 1,555 people (14.6%) aged 18 to 24, 2,719 people (25.5%) aged 25 to 44, 1,998 people (18.8%) aged 45 to 64, and 592 people (5.6%) who were 65 or older.  The median age was 24.9 years. For every 100 females, there were 102.8 males.  For every 100 females age 18 and over, there were 102.2 males.

There were 2,443 housing units at an average density of 776.3 per square mile, of the occupied units 1,268 (56.8%) were owner-occupied and 963 (43.2%) were rented. The homeowner vacancy rate was 3.7%; the rental vacancy rate was 8.2%.  5,914 people (55.6% of the population) lived in owner-occupied housing units and 4,441 people (41.7%) lived in rental housing units.

According to the 2010 United States Census, Muscoy had a median household income of $39,239, with 33.0% of the population living below the federal poverty line.

2000
At the 2000 census there were 8,919 people, 2,029 households, and 1,724 families in the CDP. The population density was 3,050.6 inhabitants per square mile (1,179.3/km). The racial makeup of the CDP was 42.7% White, 7.7% African American, 2.1% Native American, 1.0% Asian, 0.6% Pacific Islander, 40.7% from other races, and 5.3% from two or more races. Hispanic or Latino of any race were 66.3%.

Of the 2,029 households 54.5% had children under the age of 18 living with them, 54.0% were married couples living together, 21.2% had a female householder with no husband present, and 15.0% were non-families. 11.7% of households were one person and 4.2% were one person aged 65 or older.  The average household size was 4.3 and the average family size was 4.5.

The age distribution was 39.9% under the age of 18, 12.2% from 18 to 24, 27.2% from 25 to 44, 14.8% from 45 to 64, and 5.8% 65 or older.  The median age was 23 years. For every 100 females, there were 100.7 males.  For every 100 females age 18 and over, there were 99.0 males.

The median household income was $25,635 and the median family income  was $24,871. Males had a median income of $25,474 versus $20,462 for females. The per capita income for the CDP was $8,130.  About 36.9% of families and 36.5% of the population were below the poverty line, including 41.2% of those under age 18 and 16.8% of those age 65 or over.

Education
Muscoy is served by the San Bernardino City Unified School District through Vermont Elementary and Muscoy Elementary schools, and through the PAL Center, a charter school.  The US Department of Labor operates Inland Empire Job Corps Center, where young adults can complete high school and learn a career or trade.

Politics

Muscoy is located within the 5th Supervisorial district of San Bernardino County.  A board of local citizens appointed by the Supervisor, and approved by the whole Board of Supervisors, constitutes the Muscoy Municipal Advisory Council (MAC).  The Muscoy MAC currently meets on the third Tuesday of even-numbered months at County Fire Station #75, at 7:00pm.

An informal group, Concerned Citizens, meets on the first Friday of each month at Muscoy United Methodist Church to discuss quality-of-life issues for formal presentation for action by the Board of Supervisors.

References

Census-designated places in San Bernardino County, California
Census-designated places in California